Haplolobus leenhoutsii is a species of plant in the Burseraceae family. It is endemic to Borneo where it is confined to Sarawak.

The species epithet, leenhoutsii, honours Pieter Willem Leenhouts.

References

leenhoutsii
Endemic flora of Borneo
Flora of Sarawak
Vulnerable plants
Taxonomy articles created by Polbot